Jürgen von Farensbach  (1551–1602) was a Baltic German nobleman and Livonian general. Sent as the Ambassador of Livonian Confederation to Czar Ivan IV of Russia, for concluding a peace treaty, he entered the Russian service and won the battle on Oka against the Tatars on 1 August 1572. Later he served in the Danish and Polish armies.
In 1586 Farensbach gained the rank a senator of the Polish crown granted by Sigismund III, whom he had assisted in gaining the throne of Poland. As field marshal of Poland he fought against the Swedish Empire, where he was killed in the attack on the castle of Fellin on 17 May 1602.

References

People from Livonia
Baltic-German people
Livonian nobility
1551 births
1602 deaths
17th-century Latvian people
Polish people of the Livonian campaign of Stephen Báthory
Military personnel killed in action
Expatriates of the Livonian Confederation in the Tsardom of Russia